The Hikurangi Margin (also known as the Hikurangi Subduction Zone) is New Zealand's largest subduction zone and fault.

Tectonics
The Hikurangi Subduction Zone is an active subduction zone extending off the east coast of New Zealand's North Island, where the Pacific and Australian plates collide. The subduction zone where the Pacific Plate goes under the Kermadec Plate offshore of Gisborne accommodates approximately /yr of plate movement while off the Wairarapa shore this decreases to perhaps as low as /yr. It is the southern portion of the Tonga–Kermadec–Hikurangi subduction zone and its main feature is the Hikurangi Trench. The tectonics of this area can be most easily resolved by postulating between the Havre Trough to the east of the South Kermadec Ridge Seamounts, the Whakatane graben and the Taupo Volcanic Zone on the North Island of New Zealand there is a continuation of the Tonga micro-plate into the Kermadec microplate which probably extends to Cook Strait. The on land active fault systems would be consistent with the Kermadec Plate's unclear south eastern boundary being the North Island Fault System. The Kermadec Plate - Pacific Plate western boundary is the Hikurangi-Kermadec trench.

Earthquakes
Earthquakes of up to 8.2M have been recorded on the Hikurangi Margin, generating local tsunamis, and earthquakes in the 9.0M range are thought to be possible. The Ruatoria debris avalanche originated on the north part of the subduction zone and probably occurred around 170,000 years ago. Multiple uplift earthquakes will have occurred in the locked areas of the fault but a good historical record does not yet exist.

Slow slip events
For example the series of slow slip events between 2013-2016 involved moment release of approximately 7.4 Mw. At least one of the well characterised events was very close to the trench. On land parallel to the predicted fault line of the Hikurangi Margin are active faults which are not fully characterised and include the Parkhill Fault Zone near Cape Kidnappers, the Maraetotara Fault Zone, and the Flat Point Fault. The slow slip activity has been associated with on land a mud volcano eruption causing a significant landslip.

Risk
The Hikurangi Margin has the potential to produce notable earthquakes. Some significant earthquakes are:
The magnitude 7.1 Mw 2016 Te Araroa earthquake

The 21 August 2001 7.1 Mw NE of New Zealand's	East Cape
The 6 February 1995 7.5 Mw earthquake offshore East Cape
The twin magnitude 7.1 Mw 1947 Gisborne earthquakes and tsunami

The magnitude 7.0 to 7.2 Mw 1934 Pahiatua earthquake

The 1931 Hawke's Bay earthquake and its aftershocks remains New Zealand's deadliest natural disaster. It had a magnitude of 7.4 Mw{ The earthquake is thought to have occurred on one of the larger thrust faults of the Hikurangi Margin, at between from 5 km depth to 25 km depth.

The magnitude 7.0 to 7.2 Mw 1904 Cape Turnagain earthquake.

The magnitude 7.5 Mw 1863 Hawke's Bay earthquake

References

Subduction zones
Geography of the New Zealand seabed
Zealandia
Geographic areas of seismological interest
Seismic faults of New Zealand
Geology of New Zealand